Gearld T. Mullin (January 25, 1900 – April 28, 1982) was an American lawyer and politician.

Mullin was born in Omaha, Nebraska and he moved to Minneapolis, Minnesota with his parents and family in 1907. Mullin went to the Minneapolis parochial and public schools. He graduated from North Community High School in 1919. Mullin graduated from the University of St. Thomas  and from William Mitchell College of Law (formerly Minnesota College of Law). He lived with his wife and family in Minneapolis and practiced law in Minneapolis. He also worked for the American Railway Express Company. Mullin served in the Minnesota House of Representatives in 1929 and 1930 and in the Minnesota Senate from 1931 to 1957 when he resigned from the Minnesota Senate. He was a Democrat. Mullin then became President of Minnegasco. He died at St. Mary's Hospital in Minneapolis, Minnesota.

References

1900 births
1982 deaths
Businesspeople from Minneapolis
Lawyers from Minneapolis
Politicians from Minneapolis
Lawyers from Omaha, Nebraska
Politicians from Omaha, Nebraska
University of St. Thomas (Minnesota) alumni
William Mitchell College of Law alumni
Democratic Party members of the Minnesota House of Representatives
Democratic Party Minnesota state senators